The Boys’ trampoline competition at the 2014 Summer Youth Olympics was held on 22 August 2014. The event took place in Nanjing Olympic Sport Complex Gymnasium, Nanjing, China. There are 12 contestants from 12 different NOCs competing in this event.

Qualification

Notes: Q=Qualified to Final; R=Reserve

Final

References
Qualification Results
Final Results

Gymnastics at the 2014 Summer Youth Olympics